Frieda Arnold (fl. 1854 – fl. 1859), was a British courtier. She was a dresser (lady's maid) to Queen Victoria between 1854 and 1859.

She is known for her correspondence, which gives a valuable historic insight in the life of Queen Victoria's household, and is one of few published of a queen's dresser.

References 

19th-century letter writers
Queen Victoria
Members of the British Royal Household